Billie Creek Village is or ( was ) a 70-acre open-air living history museum and park, filled with 38 historical buildings and structures, and hundreds  of antiques and artifacts.  It is located at  near Rockville, Adams Township, Parke County, Indiana in the area known as the "Covered Bridge Capital of the World" for the county's 31 covered bridges.  It was formed in 1964/1965 by residents of Parke County, and opened its doors in 1969. The group Parke County, Inc. helped to form it, and a separate group, Billie Creek Village, Inc, was formed for operating it. The village took its name from nearby Williams Creek.

The buildings are from the turn of the century and range from an 1830s Log Cabin to the 1913 Schoolhouse.

The Billie Creek Inn sits across the road, and as of 2012, is separate from Billie Creek Village.

Covered bridges at Billie Creek Village
The three covered bridges are on the National Register of Historic Places
Beeson Covered Bridge
Burr Arch design built in 1906

Billie Creek Covered Bridge
Burr Arch design built in 1895

Leatherwood Station Covered Bridge
Burr Arch design built in 1899

Historical buildings at Billie Creek Village
Beeson-DePlanty Cabin - built in 1830s
Billie Creek Village General Store
Billie Creek Village Bank - former pre-1900 post office
Blacksmith shop
Burr Mill
Chautaqua Pavilion
Covered Bridge Courier Office - print shop -
Dr. Rice's Office - built mid-1800s
Farmstead with log barn
Gaebler Building - built pre-1904
Governor Wright home
Machinery Shed
Maple Syrup Camp
Refreshment Stand - built 1911
Schoolhouse
Sorghum Mill and Cider Shack
St. Joseph's Catholic Church - built 1886
Union Baptist Church

Events at Billie Creek

School Days In May
Parke County Covered Bridge Bike Tour - May
Parke County Covered Bridge Festival - October
Civil War Days - July
Ice Cream Social - 4 July
Steam Harvest Days - sponsored by The Antique Power Association - September

Demise and Reopening
Billie Creek Village had funding issues more than once, and for several years.  In 2012, the site was offered for auction with a bid in the range of $800,000 - $1.5 million.  The next step was to divide the site into multiple parcels and listings to sell it piece-meal.

In the summer of 2014, Billie Creek Village reopened with a Grand Reopening occurring on August 10, 2014.

References

External links
Current Billie Creek Village Facebook page
Old Billie Creek Village website
Billie Creek Inn website

Museums in Parke County, Indiana
Open-air museums in Indiana
Museums established in 1964
1964 establishments in Indiana